Coatbridge was a parliamentary constituency represented in the House of Commons of the Parliament of the United Kingdom.  It returned one Member of Parliament (MP) from 1918 to 1950, elected by the first past the post voting system.

It was formed by the division of Lanarkshire. The name was changed in 1950 to Coatbridge and Airdrie.  A later constituency, Coatbridge and Chryston, existed between 1997 and 2005, until it was redrawn as Coatbridge, Chryston and Bellshill.

Boundaries 
The Representation of the People Act 1918 provided that the constituency was to consist of "the burghs of Coatbridge and Airdrie".

Members of Parliament

Election results

References 

Historic parliamentary constituencies in Scotland (Westminster)
Constituencies of the Parliament of the United Kingdom established in 1918
Constituencies of the Parliament of the United Kingdom disestablished in 1950
Coatbridge
Politics of North Lanarkshire